Desmond Jeans (14 November 1903 – December 1974) was a British actor.

Biography
He was the brother of actresses Isabel and Ursula Jeans. His wife, Margaret Livesey, was the sister of the actor Roger Livesey, who later married Ursula Jeans.

Selected filmography
 The Blue Danube (1932)
 Diamond Cut Diamond (1932)
 The Girl from Maxim's (1933)
 Colonel Blood (1934)
 His Majesty and Company (1935)
 The Six Men (1951)

References

External links

 

1903 births
1974 deaths
British male stage actors
British male film actors
20th-century British male actors
British people in colonial India